Venkov is a Bulgarian masculine surname, its feminine counterpart is Venkova. Notable people with the surname include:
Alexei Venkov (born 1946), Russian mathematician
Mihail Venkov (born 1983), Bulgarian footballer
Neven Venkov (born 1982), Bulgarian footballer
Venelin Venkov (born 1982), Bulgarian Greco-Roman wrestler

Bulgarian-language surnames